Asgarlu (also known as ‘Asgar Khānlū) is a village in Chahardangeh Rural District, Hurand District, Ahar County, East Azerbaijan Province, Iran. At the 2006 census, its population was 76, in 18 families.

References 

Populated places in Ahar County